The Hino Melpha (kana:日野・メルファ) is a medium-duty bus built by Hino Motors through the J-Bus joint-venture. The range has been primarily available as tourist coach since 1998.

Models 
Melpha 7 7m (1998-2004)
KK-CH1JFEA
Melpha 9 9m (1999-2004)
KK-RR1JJFA
Melpha 9m (2004–present)
PB-RR7JJAA (2004)
BDG-RR7JJBA (2007)
SDG-RR7JJCA (2011)

See also 

 List of buses

References

External links 

Hino Melpha Homepage

Melpha
Buses
Buses of Japan
Vehicles introduced in 1998